Hill Glacier is a broad glacier that drains the west-central part of Spaatz Island, Antarctica, at the south side of Ronne Entrance. It was mapped by the United States Geological Survey (USGS) from surveys and U.S. Navy aerial photographs, 1961–66, and was named by the Advisory Committee on Antarctic Names for Lennie J. Hill, a USGS topographic engineer who was a member of the Marie Byrd Land Survey Party, 1967–68.

References

Glaciers of Palmer Land